The Legend of Kyrandia: Book Two - Hand of Fate is a 2D point-and-click adventure game, developed by Westwood Studios and published by Virgin Interactive in 1993. It is the sequel to the 1992 video game The Legend of Kyrandia, and the second game of the Fables & Fiends series. The game focuses on the story of a young alchemist and magician, who is thrust with the task of saving Kyrandia from being wiped from existence.

The game focuses on more whimsical humor than its predecessor and features more complex puzzles using the game's interface, and proved a commercial success following its launch. Hand of Fate was praised for improving on the game's style of puzzles, but criticized for its short gameplay span. A sequel titled Malcolm's Revenge was released in 1994. GOG.com released an emulated version for Microsoft Windows and Mac OS X in 2013.

Gameplay 

Like its predecessor, Hand of Fate operates on a simple point-and-click interface, rather than a system involving complex mechanics, in which players can interact with objects, the environment and people with simple clicks. Objects can be stored in the inventory of the character and used to solve puzzles, with some items capable of being dropped in a game's scene to be either removed or placed out of the way for later use. Unlike its predecessor, the game incorporates the ability to make potions with the interface, which requires finding the necessary ingredients to make these, with each potion having different effects and varying amounts of doses that can be stored for later use; the game initially requires the player to find the character's missing equipment and spellbook, before they can make potions, with additional recipes learned from finding missing pages. Players cannot retain items when moving forward in the story; some items can be found later, but others hold specific purposes in certain areas of the game.

Plot
Following the events of Fables and Fiends, the kingdom of Kyrandia faces a new danger when pieces of it suddenly beginning disappearing. The kingdom's powerful magic users, known as Mystics, search for answers to explain why this is happening, aided by a newcomer named Marko and his assistant The Hand - a giant, living gloved left hand. Holding a meeting, the Mystics determine Kyrandia requires a magic anchor stone from the center of the world to fix the problem, and assign Zanthia, a young alchemist and wizard who aided in Brandon's quest, to retrieving one. However, when Zanthia prepares for her journey with a portal potion, she quickly finds her home ransacked and her equipment stolen.

Forced to find transport to a volcano island that links to the center of the world, Zanthia quickly recovers her missing equipment in the nearby swamp, and questions who stole them. Zanthia eventually secures passage to the center of the world and locates an anchor stone, only for Marko to contact her and reveal that the hunt for one was nothing but a snipe hunt, used by The Hand to distract Zanthia and the other Mystics from its plan to wipe Kyrandia from the world. Marko reveals the real cause of the kingdom's predicament lies at the "Wheel of Fate", but is dragged away before he can help Zanthia reach it. Reaching the surface, Zanthia begins making her way to the clouds, where the Wheel of Fate resides, along the way meeting two men seeking to capture a living disembodied foot. Aiding them, she learns that The Hand is a fragment of a long-deceased gigantic evil sorcerer, and that it seeks to wipe out a kingdom to create a void that the sorcerer can use to rebuild himself.

With this knowledge, Zanthia works hard to reach the Wheel of Fate and discovers the hand removed a gear that powered the machine keeping Kyrandia in existence. Fixing it, she quickly finds herself confronting the Hand, but manages to defeat it with Marko's help. The pair swiftly return home, with Marko hinting he is in love with Zanthia, much to her surprise. In a post-credit scene, a storm occurs during one night above Kyrandia, in which a lightning bolt strikes a junkyard near the castle, hitting the statue of Malcolm and freeing him.

Reception
According to designer Rick Gush, Hand of Fate was a commercial disappointment, with sales roughly 50% lower than its predecessor had achieved. He blamed this decrease on a "cryptic" advertising campaign directed by "an unbelievably arrogant new VP of marketing", who was fired from Virgin Interactive shortly after the launch. However, the game's later bundle SKU with Fables and Fiends and Malcolm's Revenge contributed "tens of thousands of copies to the sales totals in the first few months", Gush noted. The Legend of Kyrandia series as a whole, including Hand of Fate, totaled above 250,000 units in sales by August 1996.

The Hand of Fate received 4/5 in Dragon. In 1994, Computer Gaming Worlds Scorpia approved of The Hand of Fates avoidance of unwinnable gameplay and "definite improvement in puzzle construction over Kyrandia" although "Westwood is still a little too fond of red herrings". She criticized the game's short length and "really sore point", the arcade endgame, but concluded that Hand of Fate improved on "Much of what was wrong with Legend of Kyrandia", and good for anyone looking for a short adventure game.

Reviews
ASM (Aktueller Software Markt) - Feb, 1994
Jeuxvideo.com - Sep 23, 2011
GameStar (Germany) - May, 1998

References

External links
The Legend of Kyrandia: Hand of Fate at MobyGames

 
1993 video games
Adventure games
Amiga games
DOS games
FM Towns games
Games commercially released with DOSBox
NEC PC-9801 games
Point-and-click adventure games
ScummVM-supported games
Single-player video games
Video games developed in the United States
Video games featuring female protagonists
Video games scored by Frank Klepacki
Virgin Interactive games
Westwood Studios games